Nathaniel Newnham-Davis might refer to:
Nathaniel Newnham-Davis (journalist) (1854–1917), British soldier and food writer
Nathaniel Newnham Davis (bishop) (1903–1966), British Anglican bishop